William Thomas Watson (16 March 1899 – 1969) was an English professional footballer who played as a left-sided forward. He made 405 appearances and scored 89 goals in the Football League for four clubs.

References

1899 births
1969 deaths
People from Morpeth, Northumberland
Footballers from Northumberland
English footballers
Association football forwards
Blyth Spartans A.F.C. players
Ashington A.F.C. players
Carlisle United F.C. players
Rochdale A.F.C. players
Accrington Stanley F.C. (1891) players
English Football League players